Jacqueline "Jacka" Lölling (also spelled Loelling, born 6 February 1995) is a German skeleton racer who has won numerous races and championships, including the inaugural Winter Youth Olympics skeleton competition in 2012 and the 2017 World Championships. She began competing in skeleton at the age of 12 and was selected to the German national team in 2009. She won her first two international races, as a fifteen-year-old on the Europe Cup circuit, at Cesana Pariol in 2010. Her personal coach is Kathi Wichterle, and she rides an FES sled. When not racing, Lölling works for the German Federal Police.

Notable results
Lölling raced on the Intercontinental Cup from 2011 to 2012 to 2014–15, ending with a string of three gold medals, as well as winning the Junior World Championships in 2014 at Winterberg and in 2015 at Altenberg.  Rather than follow the other ICC sliders on the North American leg of the tour, she dropped back to Europe Cup racing for the remainder of the 2014–15 season and took home a silver from the senior World Championships at Winterberg. She joined the World Cup circuit for 2015–16. Lölling recorded five podiums that season, finishing the overall World Cup rankings in second place with 1550 points, behind teammate Tina Hermann.

Lölling recorded her first regular World Cup victory at Altenberg in the 2016–17 season, which she followed up with a silver at Winterberg, behind Elisabeth Vathje of Canada – giving Lölling the European Championship for 2017. She also won the pre-Olympic test event at Pyeongchang and the race at Königssee on her way to the overall Crystal Globe for the 2016–17 season.

In the 2017–18 season, Lölling won races at Whistler, Winterberg, and Altenberg, and placed fourth at Igls; the Igls race was also the 2018 European Championship, in which she was second behind Elena Nikitina of Russia.

World Cup results
All results are sourced from the International Bobsleigh and Skeleton Federation (IBSF).

References

External links

1995 births
Living people
German female skeleton racers
Olympic skeleton racers of Germany
Olympic silver medalists for Germany
Olympic medalists in skeleton
Skeleton racers at the 2012 Winter Youth Olympics
Skeleton racers at the 2018 Winter Olympics
Skeleton racers at the 2022 Winter Olympics
Medalists at the 2018 Winter Olympics
Youth Olympic gold medalists for Germany
21st-century German women